Benin competed at the 2020 Summer Olympics in Tokyo. Originally scheduled to take place from 24 July to 9 August 2020, the Games were postponed to 23 July to 8 August 2021, because of the COVID-19 pandemic. It was the nation's twelfth appearance at the Summer Olympics, with the exception of the 1976 Summer Olympics in Montreal because of the African boycott.

Competitors
The following is the list of number of competitors in the Games.

Athletics

Beninese athletes further achieved the entry standards, either by qualifying time or by world ranking, in the following track and field events (up to a maximum of 3 athletes in each event):

Track & road events

Combined events – Women's heptathlon

Judo
 
Benin received an invitation from the Tripartite Commission and the International Judo Federation to send Rio 2016 Olympian Celtus Dossou Yovo in the men's middleweight category (90 kg) to the Olympics.

Rowing

Benin qualified one boat in the men's single sculls for the Games by finishing fifth in the A-final and securing the third of five berths available at the 2019 FISA African Olympic Qualification Regatta in Tunis, Tunisia, marking the country's debut in the sport.

Qualification Legend: FA=Final A (medal); FB=Final B (non-medal); FC=Final C (non-medal); FD=Final D (non-medal); FE=Final E (non-medal); FF=Final F (non-medal); SA/B=Semifinals A/B; SC/D=Semifinals C/D; SE/F=Semifinals E/F; QF=Quarterfinals; R=Repechage

Swimming

Benin received a universality invitation from FINA to send two top-ranked swimmers (one per gender) in their respective individual events to the Olympics, based on the FINA Points System of June 28, 2021.

References

External links
 Benin at the 2020 Summer Olympics at Olympedia

Nations at the 2020 Summer Olympics
2020
2021 in Beninese sport